The National Motor Racing Museum (NMRM) is located in the regional New South Wales city of Bathurst, approximately 200 km west of Sydney. The museum is situated adjacent to the Mount Panorama motor racing circuit at the end of Conrod Straight, close to the city.

The museum's purpose is to display and preserve material relevant to Australia's motor racing history. It exhibits some of Australia's famous modern racing cars, motorcycles and other memorabilia.

Memorial
In the front of the museum is a memorial, unveiled 8 October 2008, to Peter Brock who won the Mount Panorama race nine times, he died in the Targa West rally event in September 2006. Sculptor Julie Squires created the memorial which depicts Brock standing atop a 1984 VK Commodore, the car he drove at the Bathurst 1000 motor race in 1984.

Exhibits
Vehicles in the permanent collection include:
 The Ford XC Falcon driven to victory in the 1977 Hardie-Ferodo 1000 by Allan Moffat and Jacky Ickx.
 The Holden VK Commodore driven to victory in the 1984 James Hardie 1000 by Peter Brock and Larry Perkins - The last Group C Bathurst 1000.
 The Holden LH Torana SL/R 5000 L34 driven to victory in the 1976 Hardie-Ferodo 1000 by Bob Morris and John Fitzpatrick.
 The Ford Cortina GT500 driven to victory in the 1965 Armstrong 500 by Barry Seton and Midge Bosworth.
 A replica of the Ford XR Falcon GT driven to victory in the 1967 Gallaher 500 by Harry Firth and Fred Gibson. - The first V8 powered car to win the Bathurst race.
 The Ford Sierra RS500 driven to victory in the 1988 Tooheys 1000 by Tony Longhurst and Tomas Mezera - The first official Bathurst 1000 victory by a turbocharged car.
 The Nissan Bluebird Turbo driven by George Fury to pole position for the 1984 James Hardie 1000 - The fastest touring car to lap the old 6.172 km long circuit with a time of 2:13.85 and the first turbocharged car to claim pole position.
 The Holden Monaro 427C driven to victory in the 2002 Bathurst 24 Hour by Garth Tander, Steven Richards, Cameron McConville and Nathan Pretty - The first of two Bathurst 24 Hour races run and the debut race of the controversial 7.0L Monaro.

See also
Bathurst 1000
Mount Panorama Circuit
Bathurst, New South Wales
List of Mount Panorama races
Shannons Legends of Motorsport - a television series of which some episodes were filmed at the NMRM.

References

External links
 
 National Motor Racing Museum
 Australian Motor Museums

Bathurst, New South Wales
Museums in New South Wales
Auto racing museums and halls of fame
Supercars Championship
Motorsport in Bathurst, New South Wales
Automobile museums in Australia
Sports museums in Australia